Zobar or Zebar may refer to:
 Zobar, Bushehr